Cymbomonas is a genus of green algae in the order Pyramimonadales.

References

External links

Chlorophyta genera
Pyramimonadophyceae